FC Angusht Nazran is a Russian association football club from Nazran, Republic of Ingushetia, Russia.

History
The club was founded in 1993 as Ingushetia Nazran and entered the Russian Third League in 1994. In 1995 the club was renamed Angusht and finished second in their zone, securing promotion to the Second League (they were playing in Malgobek that season). Angusht finished second in 1998 and third in 2000, and in 2005 they managed to win their Second Division zone to get another promotion. The club spent the 2006 season in the First Division, finishing last between 22 teams. After the season Angusht went bankrupt, were renamed FC Nazran (and shortly after that FC Ongusht Nazran) and joined the Amateur Football League. In 2009 it was renamed back to Angusht. It was promoted to the second-level (now called Russian National Football League) for the 2013–14 season, but were again relegated after just one season on that level.

They were denied professional license for the 2019–20 season due to accumulated debts.

References

Football clubs in Russia
Sport in Ingushetia
Nazran
Association football clubs established in 1993
1993 establishments in Russia